Romano Orzari (born 12 December 1964) is a Canadian film and television actor. He played Hoagy Carmichael in Bix (1991), Pvt. Jimmy Rassi in Silent Night (2002), Joey Perrotta in Baby for Sale (2004), and Tom in Mères et filles (2009).  On television, he played Domenic Radell in Mutant X (2003), and Ray Prager in the second season of Durham County (2009). He also played Giovanni Auditore, the father of protagonist Ezio Auditore, in the video game Assassin's Creed II (2009) and the live-action short film Assassin's Creed: Lineage (2009).

Filmography

Film

Television series

Video games 

 Thief (2014) as Garrett

References

Bibliography
 </ref>

External links
 

1964 births
Canadian male film actors
Canadian male television actors
21st-century Canadian male actors
20th-century Canadian male actors
Living people